Memphis May Fire is the eponymous debut EP by American metalcore band Memphis May Fire. It was released on December 4, 2007 through Trustkill Records. This EP was the only official release by Memphis May Fire to feature Chase Ryan Robbins, the former vocalist who left the band in 2008 to focus on his newborn child. Guitarist Kellen McGregor described Ryan's contributions to Rock Sound, "Chase writes about dreams that make absolutely no sense. We're not a really serious band and that part is reflected in Chase's lyrics."

Josh Grabelle, president of Trustkill Records, commented on the band and this EP, "There is a lot of really exciting, young, dangerous music coming out of Texas right now, and Memphis May Fire are the cream of the crop. Not since Bullet for My Valentine's Hand of Blood EP have we heard a more compelling set of songs for an EP, where absolutely every song is bone-chillingly perfect, and timeless. These guys are on their way to something huge."

Track listing
All lyrics written by Chase Ryan, all music composed by Kellen McGregor and Memphis May Fire

Personnel
Memphis May Fire
 Chase Ryan Robbins – Lead vocals
 Kellen McGregor – lead guitar, backing vocals
 Ryan Bentley – Rhythm guitar
 Austin Radford – Bass
 Ryan Dooley – Drums

Production
 Produced by Geoff Rockwell and Memphis May Fire
 Mastered and mixed by Geoff Rockwell
 A&R by Josh Grabelle
 Photography by Richard Redd (Redd Room Studios)

References

External links
Memphis May Fire on Myspace
Memphis May Fire on Trustkill

2007 EPs
Memphis May Fire albums
Trustkill Records EPs